The 1973 Astro-Bluebonnet Bowl, part of the 1973 bowl game season, took place on December 29, 1973, at the Houston Astrodome in Houston, Texas. The competing teams were the Tulane Green Wave and Houston Cougars, with each competing as a football independent. Houston won the game 47–7.

Teams

Houston

The 1973 Houston squad finished the regular season with a 10–1 record with its lone loss coming against Auburn. The 10–1 record was the best recorded in the school's history to that point. The appearance marked the third for Houston in the Astro-Bluebonnet Bowl, and their fifth overall bowl game.

Tulane

The 1973 Tulane squad finished the regular season with a 9–2 record with losses coming against Kentucky and Maryland. Prior to victory over Vanderbilt, the Green Wave accepted an invitation to play in the Astro-Bluebonnet Bowl. The appearance marked the first for Tulane in the Astro-Bluebonnet Bowl, and their fifth overall bowl game.

Game summary
 Houston - Marshall Johnson 75 run (Ricky Terrell kick), 12:13 remaining in the 1st quarter
 Houston – Leonard Parker 1-yard touchdown run (Ricky Terrell kick), 8:41 remaining in the 2nd quarter
 Houston – Leonard Parker 3-yard touchdown run (Ricky Terrell kick), 1:24 remaining in the 2nd quarter
 Tulane – Tom Fortner 32-yard touchdown pass from Buddy Gilbert (David Falgoust kick), 1:06 remaining in the 2nd quarter
 Houston – Nobles 2-yard touchdown run (Ricky Terrell kick), 6:42 remaining in the 3rd quarter
 Houston – Donnie McGraw 1-yard touchdown run (Ricky Terrell kick), 5:28 remaining in the 3rd quarter
 Houston – Donnie McGraw 32-yard touchdown run (kick failed), 13:41 remaining in the 4th quarter
 Houston – David Husmann 7-yard touchdown run (kick failed), 6:53 remaining in the 4th quarter

Statistics

Aftermath
Beginning in 1996, the Green Wave and Cougars became conference rivals when Conference USA began play in football (the conference began play in basketball and other sports during the 1995–96 school year). Both schools moved to the American Athletic Conference in 2014.

References

Bluebonnet Bowl
Houston Cougars football bowl games
Tulane Green Wave football bowl games
Bluebonnet Bowl
Astro-Bluebonnet Bowl
Astro-Bluebonnet